The American Indian Defense Association (AIDA) was an organization founded in 1923 by social worker John Collier that fought to protect religious freedom and tribal property for Native Americans in the United States.

History of the AIDA

In the 1920s Antonio Luhan, a member of the Taos Pueblo, showed John Collier the poor living conditions in American Indian communities. In response to what he saw, Collier founded the American Indian Defense Association. For the next decade Collier headed Indian reform efforts, and in 1933 President Franklin D. Roosevelt appointed Collier as the new commissioner of Indian Affairs. Almost immediately Collier tried to change the government's direction by revitalizing American Indian life and culture.

AIDA was also set up in response to the 1921 and 1923 Leavitt Bill, also known as the Dance Order. This bill threatened to remove the right of Pueblo Indians to perform some of their traditional dances in New Mexico. The Bursum Bill of 1922 also posed a threat as it would authorize the acquisition of Pueblo lands.  However, AIDA was able to block both bills successfully.

American Indian culture

American Indians culture had been stripped away by measures like the Dawes Act, which had ended tribal government and authorized the sale of tribal land to individuals. Henry Dawes, who authored the Dawes Act, was quoted as saying that to be civilized, one must "wear civilized clothes...cultivate the ground, live in houses, ride in Studebaker wagons, send children to school, drink whiskey and own property."

Antonio Luhan described how government policies and the Bureau of Indian Affairs commissioners who enforced them overwhelmed American Indian culture,

Indian Reorganization Act

To put these reform ideas into law, the United States Congress passed the Indian Reorganization Act of 1934, which  reversed the Dawes Act policy, and as described in section 3 of that act it was to "restore to tribal ownership the remaining surplus lands of any Indian reservation heretofore opened, or authorized to be opened, to sale, or any other form of disposal by Presidential proclamation, or by any of the public land laws of the United States".  The Act provided funds to start tribal business ventures and to pay for the college education of young American Indians. The allotment process was halted and further losses of Indian land were halted. Tribes were encouraged to create strong tribal governments. Tribes were given the right to form constitutions, have self-government, and to form tribal corporations. A program to provide federal loan money for college and/or vocational school expenses was begun.

Criticism

Critics of the American Indian Defense Association complained that Collier had not obtained enough input from the tribes themselves in formulating policies, and that the programs decreased the power of women in some tribes. Still, two-thirds of the nation's American Indians tribes voted to participate in the new programs.

References and notes

Legal advocacy organizations in the United States
Native American law
Native American rights organizations
Organizations established in 1923